Masters of Sex is an American television drama series developed for television by Michelle Ashford and based on the biography Masters of Sex: The Life and Times of William Masters and Virginia Johnson, the Couple Who Taught America How to Love by Thomas Maier. Masters of Sex tells the story of Dr. William Masters (Michael Sheen) and Virginia Johnson (Lizzy Caplan), two pioneering researchers of human sexuality at Washington University in St. Louis, Missouri. The series premiered on September 29, 2013 on Showtime, and was cancelled on November 30, 2016 after four seasons.

Series overview

Episodes

Season 1 (2013)

Season 2 (2014)

Season 3 (2015)

Season 4 (2016)

Ratings

References

External links 

Lists of American drama television series episodes